Thomas Gould (26 September 1863 — 30 March 1948) was an English cricketer who played for Derbyshire in 1896 and 1897.

Gould was born in Brassington, Derbyshire, the son of Mark Gould, a lead miner and later lime picker, and his wife Mary.

Gould debuted in the 1896 season against Essex when he was an  economical bowler and made a good showing with the bat in the lower-middle order. He made one other appearance during that season in a match that was abandoned as a draw. In 1897 season, he achieved his best bowling performance of 4–45 against Sussex, but made little impression in the following match. Gould played 10 innings in 7 first-class matches with a top score of 18 not out and an average of 7.87. He took 9 wickets at an average of 25.0.

Gould died at the age of 84 in Burton-on-Trent.

References

1863 births
1948 deaths
English cricketers
Derbyshire cricketers
People from Derbyshire Dales (district)
Cricketers from Derbyshire